Bill Brand may refer to:

Bill Brand (TV series), a British television drama series produced in 1976
Bill Brand (film artist) (born 1949), experimental film and video artist